George Reginald Cohen  (22 October 1939 – 23 December 2022) was an English professional footballer who played as a right-back. He spent his entire professional career with Fulham and won the 1966 FIFA World Cup with England. He is a member of the English Football Hall of Fame and was the uncle of rugby union World Cup winner Ben Cohen.

Playing career

Fulham
Cohen was a one-club footballer, joining Fulham professionally in 1956 and remaining there until retirement through injury 13 years later in March 1969. Fulham had been relegated to the Second Division the season before he retired as a player and did not return to the top flight for 33 years. He ended his career with 459 appearances for the club, a figure surpassed by only five other players in Fulham's history. As a full-back he also managed to score six League goals for Fulham.

England

Blackpool's Jimmy Armfield played in the 1962 World Cup in Chile. In April 1964, however, Armfield won his 41st cap in a 1–0 defeat to an Alan Gilzean of Scotland goal at Hampden Park. England coach Alf Ramsey duly tried out Cohen for his international debut a month later in a 2–1 win over Uruguay. With Armfield suffering an injury – badly timed with the World Cup imminent – Cohen went on to play in 21 of the next 23 internationals. Armfield managed two more caps in preparation for the 1966 tournament after regaining his fitness, but Cohen was Ramsey's first choice by the time the England-hosted competition started.

Ramsey's team played without conventional wingers, allowing extra strength in midfield and relying on young, stamina-based players like Martin Peters and Alan Ball to drift from centre to flank and back again as required. When these players were occupied in more central positions, or chasing high up the flank and needing support, attacking full-backs like Cohen proved their worth.

After England's win over Argentina in the quarter-finals, Cohen was featured in a photograph in which Ramsey prevented him from swapping shirts as customary with an opponent – Ramsey had referred to the Argentine players as "animals" for their fouling and gamesmanship during the match.

Three days later, one of Cohen's overlapping runs and near-post passes contributed to Charlton's semi-final clincher as England edged out Portugal.

As vice-captain in the final against West Germany Cohen won his 30th cap. He blocked the last-minute Lothar Emmerich free-kick that subsequently found its way across the England six-yard box for Wolfgang Weber to equalise 2–2. England won 4–2 in extra-time.

Cohen played seven of the next eight internationals. His 37th and final England appearance was a 2–0 win over Northern Ireland at Wembley on 22 November 1967. Although he never scored for England, Cohen was regarded as "England's greatest right-back" due to his skilled attacking intent. He was the first of England's 1966 XI to retire from international football.

Coaching career
Following his retirement, Cohen coached the Fulham youth team and the England under-23 team for a time. He also briefly managed non-league Tonbridge, who he led to victory in the Kent Senior Cup in 1974-75.

Accolades
Manchester United's George Best described Cohen as "the best full-back I ever played against," while Alf Ramsey called Cohen "England's greatest right-back". Cohen also bears the distinction of being the only Fulham player to have won a World Cup winner's medal while at the Cottagers.

Cohen was awarded the MBE in 2000, along with four teammates from 1966 after a campaign from sections of the media who were surprised that the quintet had never been officially recognised for their part in England's success. The others were Ball, Wilson, Nobby Stiles and Roger Hunt.

In October 2016, a statue of Cohen was unveiled at Craven Cottage by club chairman Shahid Khan to commemorate their former player and mark the 50th anniversary of the England World Cup win. Cohen attended the ceremony. Hammersmith & Fulham Council announced that it was making the former footballer a freeman of the borough.

In a documentary on Channel 4 to find the greatest England XI, Cohen was given the right-back spot by the public, ahead of Phil Neal and Gary Neville. He was one of four veterans of the 1966 team to make it.

His attacking intent has been regarded as an encouragement for modern day full-backs as well.

Later life

In 2003, he published George Cohen: My Autobiography.. He was a frequent guest at functions around the country as well as at Craven Cottage raising money for cancer charities. He hosted a luncheon before every home game at Craven Cottage in the George Cohen Restaurant.

In 2010, Cohen criticized changes to the design of footballs following the intense criticism of the Adidas Jabulani used at the 2010 World Cup. Cohen was quoted: "Designers have constantly tried to create more goals by using lighter and lighter balls. It was thought they would fly further and everyone loves to see a 30-yard screamer bend into the top corner. But things have gone too far."

Cohen was also known for being vocal in his demands for a public inquiry into dementia in football, following research that suggested ex-professionals were more than three times at risk of getting the condition.

Personal life and death
Born in Kensington, Cohen was brought up in Fulham, where his Irish-born mother, Catherine (nee Gibbs), was a stores manager at the local Lots Road power station and his father, Louis (known as Harry) Cohen, was a gas fitter. Though of Jewish heritage on his father’s side, with some of his family originally from Ukraine, he was brought up in the Church of England. He married his wife Daphne in 1962. They had two sons.

He had a history of bowel cancer, being first diagnosed with the condition in 1976. He was ultimately declared cancer-free in 1990.

His nephew Ben Cohen is a former English rugby union player and Rugby World Cup winner with England in 2003.

Cohen died on 23 December 2022, at the age of 83,  leaving Bobby Charlton and Geoff Hurst as the last two living English players of the 1966 World Cup final. He was known as one of the few "greatest one-trophy wonders", winning solely a World Cup winner's medal in his career.

Honours
FIFA World Cup: 1966

References

1939 births
2022 deaths
1966 FIFA World Cup players
Association football fullbacks
England international footballers
England under-23 international footballers
English autobiographers
English Football Hall of Fame inductees
English Football League players
English Football League representative players
English footballers
Footballers from Kensington
FIFA World Cup-winning players
Fulham F.C. players
Members of the Order of the British Empire
English people of Irish descent
English people of Ukrainian-Jewish descent